Chirag Pathak (born 2 February 1987) is an Indian first-class cricketer who plays for Saurashtra.

References

External links
 

1987 births
Living people
Indian cricketers
Saurashtra cricketers
People from Junagadh district